The 2010–11 Western Michigan Broncos men's basketball team were the National Collegiate Athletic Association Division I college basketball team representing Western Michigan University.  WMU was coached by Steve Hawkins who was in his eighth season as head coach of the school.  The Broncos played their home games at University Arena in Kalamazoo, Michigan.

Roster

Schedule

|-
!colspan=9 style=|Regular season

|-
!colspan=9 style=| MAC tournament

|-
!colspan=9 style=| CollegeInsider.com tournament

Source

References

Western Michigan Broncos
Western Michigan Broncos men's basketball seasons
Western Michigan